National Highway 14 (NH 14) is a  National Highway in India. It runs from Morgram to Kharagpur in the Indian state of West Bengal.

Route
NH 14 originates from its junction with NH 12 at Morgram in Murshidabad district and passes through Lohapur (a little off the highway), Nalhati, Rampurhat, Mallarpur, Gonpur, Deucha, Mohammad Bazar, Tilpara Barrage across Mayurakshi River, Suri, Bakreswar Thermal Power Plant Township (a little off the highway), Dubrajpur, Bhimgara (all in Birbhum district), Pandabeswar, Haripur, Sonpur Bazari, Raniganj (all in Paschim Bardhaman district), Mejia, Durlabhpur, Gangajalghati, Amarkanan, Bankura, Bheduasole, Onda, Bishnupur (all in Bankura district), Garbeta, Chandrakona Road, Salboni, Midnapore (all in Paschim Medinipur district)  before terminating at its junction with NH 16 near Kharagpur.

See also 
 List of National Highways in India (by Highway Number)
 National Highways Development Project

References

External links
 NH 14 on OpenStreetMap

Transport in Kharagpur
Transport in Birbhum district
National highways in India
National Highways in West Bengal